Almir Gredić (born 27 April 1976) is a Bosnian retired professional footballer who played as an attacking midfielder.

From 27 December 2012 until 27 September 2015, he held the role of president of Bosnian Premier League club Željezničar, replacing Sabahudin Žujo, becoming the youngest ever Željezničar president in history at the age of 36.

International career
Gredić made his debut for Bosnia and Herzegovina in a March 2000 friendly match away against Jordan and has earned a total of 4 caps, scoring no goals. His final international was an August 2005 friendly against Estonia.

Personal life
Gredić has been married to Aida Murtezić since 2010 and together have two children.

Honours

Player
Željezničar
Bosnian Premier League: 1997–98, 2000–01, 2001–02
Bosnian Cup: 1999–00, 2000–01, 2002–03
Bosnian Supercup: 1998, 2000, 2001

References

1976 births
Living people
People from Prijepolje
Bosniaks of Serbia
Association football midfielders
Bosnia and Herzegovina footballers
Bosnia and Herzegovina under-21 international footballers
Bosnia and Herzegovina international footballers
FK Mogren players
FK Željezničar Sarajevo players
Montenegrin First League players
Premier League of Bosnia and Herzegovina players
Bosnia and Herzegovina expatriate footballers
Expatriate footballers in Montenegro 
Bosnia and Herzegovina expatriate sportspeople in Montenegro
Bosnia and Herzegovina chairpersons of corporations
FK Željezničar Sarajevo presidents